The ICC Men's Cricket World Cup Super League is an international cricket competition contested in the One Day International (ODI) format and the top level of the three-league Cricket World Cup qualification system which was introduced in 2019. 13 teams participate in the league, of which the top 8 teams directly qualify for the next Cricket World Cup and the bottom 5 teams advance to the World Cup Qualifier for another chance to qualify. The Super League replaced the ODI rankings as the route to direct qualification for the 2023 Cricket World Cup. The only edition of the ODI Super League is running between 2020–2023.

Background
The Super League was introduced after the 2019 Cricket World Cup and introduced improvements to the World Cup qualification process. The previous use of ODI rankings involved intricate calculations and was unbalanced. It was open to manipulation with no obligation for top teams to play against lesser teams, who were left with no chance to improve their positions. In comparison, the Super League has a simple points table and the same number of matches for each team.

Facing better competition provided lesser teams with the prospect of better attendance, financial gain and increased popularity of cricket in their countries. The Netherlands were scheduled to host England in May 2021 but the series was pushed back a year as the ongoing COVID-19 pandemic could have restricted attendance and made the series financially unviable.

Competition format

Competition

The Cricket World Cup is held once every four years and the Super League forms part of the qualification process for each edition. 13 teams each plays 24 matches and are ranked by their results. The fixtures are agreed by consensus between the teams. The top ranked teams directly qualify for the next World Cup while the remaining teams advance to the World Cup Qualifier.

Promotion and relegation
A system of promotion and relegation exists between the Super League and ICC Cricket World Cup League 2. In the Global World Cup Qualifier, should the bottom ranked team from the Super League be ranked below the champions of League 2, they will be relegated to League 2 and the League 2 champions will be promoted to the Super League.

Editions

References

External links
 Official website

Super League
Qualification for cricket competitions